Eric Crawford may refer to:

Eric Crawford (soccer) for Toronto Lynx
Eric Crawford (Taken)
Eric Crawford (sports journalist) on WDRB
Eric Crawford, co-writer of I Can't Hear the Music
Rick Crawford (politician) (Eric Alan Crawford, born 1966), Member of the U.S. House of Representatives from Arkansas